Nochistlán is one of the 58 municipalities in the Mexican state of Zacatecas. Founded by the Caxcanes, it was also the first site of Guadalajara in Mexico.

Nochistlán  is a town in the Mexican state of  Zacatecas. Nuño Beltrán de Guzmán, on December 3, 1531, hired Cristóbal de Oñate to establish a village in Nochistlán; the village would be named Guadalajara to honor Guzmán for having been born in Guadalajara.
Guadalajara was founded in Nochistlán on January 5, having as officials Cristóbal de Oñate, Sancho Ortiz de Zúñiga and Miguel Ibarra. They worked at this project for only 16 months and created the first layout of Guadalajara.

The first news that we have regarding the natives of these lands points to the Tecuexe. These people established settlements around 1000. Later in the 12th century a new group of people moved in, these people were called Caxcan and they were from the valley in Tuitlán, which is now found in the municipality of Villanueva, Zacatecas. The Caxcan established Nochistlán by driving out the Tecuexe by force.

Population
In the 2005 census, the Municipality of Nochistlán reported a population of 26,195. Of these, 16,562 lived in the municipal seat, Nochistlán, and the remainder lived in surrounding rural communities.

History
The first news that we have regarding the natives of these lands points to the Tecuexes. These people settled in the region around 1000 A.D. Later, in the 12th century, a new group of people called the Caxcanes moved in, they were from the valley in Tuitlán, which is now found in the Municipality of Villanueva, Zacatecas. The Caxcanes established Nochistlán by driving out the Tecuexes by force. 

On December 3, 1531, Nuño Beltrán de Guzmán hired Cristobal de Oñate to establish a village in Nochistlán, (now a town in Zacatecas) the village would be named Guadalajara in honor of Guzmán for his birth in Guadalajara.
Guadalajara was founded in Nochistlán on January 5, having as officials Oñate, Sancho Ortiz de Zuñiga and Miguel de Ibarra. They worked at this project for only 16 months and created the first layout of Guadalajara.

Location
Latitude - 21°48'03" N
Longitude - 102°45'57" W
Population 26,195

References

External links
 Nochistlán Government Site (In Spanish)
Nochistlán official MySpace

Municipalities of Zacatecas